Winfield Scott Hammond (November 17, 1863December 30, 1915) was an American politician. He was a member of the Democratic Party.

Biography
Hammond was born in 1863 in Southborough, Massachusetts, the son of Ellen P. (Panton) and John Washington Hammond. His mother was born in England. He served from Minnesota in the United States House of Representatives in the 60th, 61st, 62nd, and 63rd congresses from March 4, 1907, to January 6, 1915. He was the 18th Governor of Minnesota from January 5, 1915, until his death December 30, 1915. Hammond is just one of four Minnesota Democrats to win a gubernatorial election with a Democrat in the White House. He was the second governor of Minnesota to die in office. Joseph Alfred Arner Burnquist succeeded to the governorship to fill the vacancy left by Hammond's death.

Minnesota's eighteenth governor had little time to effect significant change before he died in office. Had he lived longer, perhaps Hammond would have realized his ambitious plans to reorganize state government by minimizing bureaucracy and eliminating waste to make Minnesota's wheels turn more efficiently. Instead, his most notable legislation was the "county option bill," a restriction on liquor sales that pleased prohibition advocates.

An inscription under Hammond's bust in the capitol describes him as "a scholar in politics". He earned bachelor's and master's degrees from Dartmouth College and, upon moving to Mankato at age 21, became principal of its high school. He later studied law while he supervised schools in Watonwan County. He made his permanent home in St. James, where he practiced law and established himself as a political contender.

A staunch Democrat in a Republican community, he lost his first bid for Congress in 1892, but perseverance and bipartisan support eventually brought him a congressional seat 14 years later. He interrupted his fourth consecutive term to leave Washington and run for governor.

Hammond had been in office only eight months when he suffered ptomaine poisoning on a trip south and died of a stroke, aged 52, in Clinton, Louisiana on December 30, 1915.

References

Biographical information and his  gubernatorial records are available for research use at the Minnesota Historical Society.

External links
 

1863 births
1915 deaths
Dartmouth College alumni
Democratic Party governors of Minnesota
People from Southborough, Massachusetts
Democratic Party members of the United States House of Representatives from Minnesota
19th-century American politicians
People from St. James, Minnesota